HD 114762 is a triple star system approximately  away in the constellation Coma Berenices. It consists of a yellow-white F-type main-sequence star  and two red dwarf companions  &  approximately 0.36 &  distant. Both are low-metal subdwarfs. Planets around such metal-poor stars are rare (three known cases are HD 22781, HD 111232, and HD 181720). A telescope or strong binoculars are needed to view the primary.  had been used by scientists as a "standard star", one whose radial velocity is well established, but with the discovery of the spectroscopic companion  its usefulness as a standard has been called into question.

The red dwarf companion is classified as an ultra-cool dwarf, with a spectral type around M9.  With a visual magnitude of 15 and separated from the primary by only three arcseconds, it can only be seen with a powerful telescope.  It is estimated to be around 10 billion years old, although the properties of such low-mass stars are very similar across a wide range of ages.  It is calculated have only 8% of the mass of the Sun, a tenth of its radius, and with a temperature of about  it produces less than a thousandth of its luminosity.

Spectroscopic companion

In 1989, a companion object, was found orbiting  by Latham, et al., using Doppler spectroscopy, but its existence was not confirmed until 1991 by Cochran, et al. Its orbital distance and revolution is similar to that of Mercury, though it has twice the eccentricity. This makes it a red dwarf star, or a massive brown dwarf.

References

Coma Berenices
Triple star systems
F-type main-sequence stars
M-type main-sequence stars
114762
BD+18 2700
064426
J13121982+1731016
Am stars